Decent interval is a theory regarding the end of the Vietnam War which argues that from 1971 or 1972, the Nixon Administration abandoned the goal of preserving South Vietnam and instead aimed to save face by preserving a "decent interval" between withdrawal and South Vietnamese collapse. Therefore, Nixon could avoid becoming the first United States president to lose a war.

A variety of evidence from the Nixon tapes and from transcripts of meetings with foreign leaders is cited to support this theory, including Henry Kissinger's statement before the 1973 Paris Peace Accords that "our terms will eventually destroy him" (referring to South Vietnamese president Nguyễn Văn Thiệu). However, both Kissinger and Nixon denied that such a strategy existed.

Background
Already by late 1970 or early 1971, President Richard Nixon and his National Security Advisor Henry Kissinger "effectively abandoned the hope of a military victory" in the Vietnam War. Increasingly, they questioned the premise that the South Vietnamese Army would ever be able to defend its country without American help, especially after the Lam Son 719 debacle.

Following the Paris Peace Accords, the Nixon administration claimed that "peace with honor" had been achieved and that South Vietnamese independence had been guaranteed. After the Fall of Saigon, Nixon and Kissinger blamed the failure of the accords on the United States Congress refusing to continue support to South Vietnam—in other words, the Vietnam stab-in-the-back myth. 

Publicly, Nixon stated that his goal from the peace accords was for North Vietnam to recognize South Vietnam's right to choose a leader by democratic election. The decent interval theory holds that, privately, the Nixon administration did not plan for the continuation of South Vietnam and was only interested in the release of United States prisoners of war and maintaining a "decent interval" before South Vietnamese collapse. If a "decent interval" elapsed between the withdrawal of American troops and the fall of the South Vietnamese government, Nixon could avoid the blame of being the first American president to lose a war. 

The idea of a decent interval was absent from public debate during the Nixon years and originally advanced in a 1977 book of the same name by former CIA analyst Frank Snepp. However Snepp does not subscribe to the full theory of intentional abandonment of South Vietnam, but rather that Kissinger, U.S. Ambassador to Vietnam Graham Martin and others engaged in the same kinds of self-deluded thinking after the Paris accords that had gotten the US into Vietnam in the first place. What Snepp was most outraged over was the haste with which the Americans pulled out in April 1975, abandoning many key South Vietnamese allies and intelligence assets to their fates. Snepp was not party to the high-level negotiations in which the "decent interval" strategy occurred.

Evidence

Historian Ken Hughes wrote, "The  proof  that  Nixon  and  Kissinger  timed  military  withdrawal  to  the  1972  election  and negotiated  a  “decent  interval”  comes  from  extraordinarily  rich  and  undeniable  sources—the  Nixon tapes  and  the  near-verbatim  transcripts  that  NSC  aides  made  of  negotiations  with  foreign  leaders." This is despite "the  normal  human  reluctance  to  produce  self-incriminating evidence", which according to Hughes explains why more details about the strategy are not known.

The first sign of the strategy appears in the Nixon tapes on 18 February 1971, Kissinger stated that after a peace agreement was concluded, "What we can then tell the South Vietnamese—they’ve got a year without war  to  build  up." According to Hughes, the statement indicates that Kissinger already realized that peace would not last. On 19 March, Kissinger stated that "We  can’t  have  it knocked over—brutally—to put it brutally—before the election", justifying timing the withdrawal of troops to the 1972 American presidential election. Nixon was also privately skeptical of the Vietnamization program, which he officially stated was "a plan in which we will withdraw all of our forces from Vietnam on a schedule in accordance with our program, as the South Vietnamese become strong enough to defend their own freedom". Hughes writes that Nixon's statements on Vietnamization are unambiguously false and the program to be a "fraud".

In his first secret meeting with Zhou Enlai in 1971, Kissinger explained that the United States wanted a full withdrawal, the return of all POWs, and a ceasefire for "18 months or some period." Kissinger noted that "If the government is as unpopular  as  you  seem  to  think,  then  the  quicker  our  forces  are  withdrawn,  the  quicker  it  will  be overthrown. And if it is overthrown after we withdraw, we will not intervene." In later meetings, Kissinger used the words "reasonable  interval",  a  "sufficient  interval",  and  a "time  interval" to refer to the time that would have to pass after United States withdrawal before the aggression against South Vietnam would not result in a forceful reaction from the United States.

In discussions with Chinese and Soviet leaders, Kissinger stated that the United States would not intervene if more than eighteen months passed since a settlement. A crucial point in the negotiations occurred after the North conceded in its demand for South Vietnamese President Nguyễn Văn Thiệu's resignation; according to American intelligence, the South Vietnamese government would quickly unravel without him. On 3 August 1972, Nixon stated, "I think we could take, in my view, almost anything, frankly, that we can force on Thieu. South Vietnam probably can never even survive anyway." Kissinger replied: "We’ve got to find some formula that holds the thing together a year or two." 
Two days before the Paris Peace Accords were signed according to chief North Vietnamese negotiator Lê Đức Thọ's proposal (8 October 1972), Kissinger told Nixon twice that the terms would probably destroy South Vietnam: "I also think that Thieu is right, that our terms will eventually destroy him."

Proponents

Historian Jeffrey Kimball supports the decent interval theory and promoted it in various books, including The Vietnam War Files (2004) and Nixon's Nuclear Specter (2015).  Kimball argued that Nixon Administration adopted the decent interval strategy in the second half of Nixon's first term. According to Hughes, Kimball is "the leading scholar of the 'decent interval'".

In his book Henry Kissinger and the American Century, Jeremi  Suri wrote: "By 1971 [Kissinger] and Nixon would accept a 'decent interval' between U.S. disengagement and a North Vietnamese takeover in the south. Secret talks with Hanoi would allow Kissinger to manage this process, preserving the image of American strength and credibility."
In a 2003 paper, Finnish historian Jussi Hanhimäki argued that 

Hughes is very critical of the decent interval strategy: 
According to Japanese historian Tega Yusuke, writing in 2012, decent interval "is becoming the standard explanation" because South Vietnam in fact collapsed in 1975.

Opponents
Kissinger and Nixon both denied that they had used a "decent interval" strategy. Kissinger wrote, "Nor is it correct that all we sought was a 'decent interval' before a final collapse of Saigon. All of us who negotiated the agreement of October 12 were convinced that we had vindicated the anguish of a decade not by a 'decent interval' but by a decent settlement." However, both had a vested interest in keeping the "decent interval" secret.

Based on newly declassified documents, in 2001 Larry Berman wrote a book, No Peace, No Honor in which he argued that Nixon actually planned for a permanent war in Vietnam, rather than a decent interval before defeat.

Mixed
Luke Nichter, a historian who studied the Nixon tapes, has argued that, before Nixon's visit to China in early 1972, the decent interval theory did not explain the fluctuating attitude of Nixon and Kissinger to the war, which had sharp ups and downs depending on casualty figures and news reports. Nichter writes, "at times they speak of desiring no interval at all other than the duration necessary to quickly withdraw troops and POWs". After the China visit, "the tenor and content of their discussions seems much closer to support for the idea of a decent interval theory". In his book The Nixon Tapes, Nichter and his coauthor write opposing "scholars [who] argue that Nixon and Kissinger’s strategy in Vietnam was never more than securing a ‘decent interval'". However, Hughes considers this to be a misrepresentation because he does not know of any scholars who argue that decent interval characterized the administration's strategy throughout.

Johannes Kadura argues that Nixon and Kissinger "simultaneously maintained a Plan A of further supporting Saigon and a Plan B of shielding Washington should their maneuvers prove futile." According to Kadura, the "decent interval" concept has been "largely misrepresented," in that Nixon and Kissinger "sought to gain time, make the North turn inward, and create a perpetual equilibrium" rather than acquiescing in the collapse of South Vietnam.

Citations

Sources
 Paperback ed. 

Historiography of the Vietnam War
Nixon administration controversies